Benburb Castle is a castle situated in Benburb, County Tyrone, Northern Ireland.  It is built on a limestone cliff overlooking the River Blackwater, the border between County Tyrone and County Armagh. A 19th-century tower house occupies the south west area of the bawn. The castle has been restored and stands in the grounds of the imposing Servite Priory, a religious order based in the village.

Benburb or Wingfield's Castle is a State Care Historic Monument in the townland of Benburb, in Dungannon and South Tyrone Borough Council area, at grid ref: H8146 5199.

See also 

Castles in Northern Ireland

References 

Benburb Castle

Castles in County Tyrone